This is a list of different language classification proposals developed for the indigenous languages of the Americas. The article is divided into North, Central, and South America sections; however, the classifications do not correspond to these divisions.

North America

Glottolog 4.1 (2019)
Glottolog 4.1 (2019) recognizes 42 independent families and 31 isolates in North America (73 total). The vast majority are (or were) spoken in the United States, with 26 families and 26 isolates (52 total).

North American languages families proposed in Glottolog 4.1

Families (42)
Otomanguean (180)
Arawakan (78)
Uto-Aztecan (69)
Algic (46)
Athabaskan-Eyak-Tlingit (45)
Mayan (33)
Chibchan (27)
Salishan (25)
Mixe-Zoque (19)
Siouan (18)
Eskimo–Aleut (12)
Totonacan (12)
Cochimi-Yuman (11)
Iroquoian (11)
Miwok-Costanoan (11)
Kiowa-Tanoan (8)
Muskogean (7)
Pomoan (7)
Chumashan (6)
Wakashan (6)
Caddoan (5)
Misumalpan (5)
Sahaptian (5)
Xincan (5)
Chinookan (4)
Huavean (4)
Maiduan (4)
Yokutsan (4)
Kalapuyan (3)
Shastan (3)
Tequistlatecan (3)
Tsimshian (3)
Chimakuan (2)
Coosan (2)
Haida (2)
Jicaquean (2)
Keresan (2)
Lencan (2)
Palaihnihan (2)
Tarascan (2)
Wintuan (2)
Yuki-Wappo (2)

Isolates (31)
Adai
Alsea-Yaquina
Atakapa
Beothuk
Cayuse
Chimariko
Chitimacha
Coahuilteco
Comecrudan
Cotoname
Cuitlatec
Esselen
Guaicurian
Karankawa
Karok
Klamath-Modoc
Kutenai
Maratino
Molale
Natchez
Salinan
Seri
Siuslaw
Takelma
Timucua
Tonkawa
Tunica
Washo
Yana
Yuchi
Zuni

Gallatin (1836)

An early attempt at North American language classification was attempted by A. A. Albert Gallatin published in 1826, 1836, and 1848. Gallatin's classifications are missing several languages which are later recorded in the classifications by Daniel G. Brinton and John Wesley Powell. (Gallatin supported the assimilation of indigenous peoples to Euro-American culture.)

 (Current terminology is indicated parenthetically in italics.)

Families
 Algonkin-Lenape  (=Algonquian)
 Athapascas  (=Athabaskan)
 Catawban  (=Catawba + Woccons)
 Eskimaux  (=Eskimoan)
 Iroquois  (=Northern Iroquoian)
 Cherokees  (=Southern Iroquoian)
 Muskogee  (=Eastern Muskogean)
 Chahtas   (=Western Muskogean)
 Sioux  (=Siouan)

Languages

Gallatin (1848)
Families

 Algonquian languages
 Athabaskan languages
 Catawban languages
 Eskimoan languages
 Iroquoian languages (Northern)
 Iroquoian languages (Southern)
 Muskogean languages
 Siouan languages

Languages

Powell's (1892) "Fifty-eight"
John Wesley Powell, an explorer who served as director of the Bureau of American Ethnology, published a classification of 58 "stocks" that is the "cornerstone" of genetic classifications in North America. Powell's classification was influenced by Gallatin to a large extent.

John Wesley Powell was in a race with Daniel G. Brinton to publish the first comprehensive classification of North America languages (although Brinton's classification also covered South and Central America). As a result of this competition, Brinton was not allowed access to the linguistic data collected by Powell's fieldworkers.

 (More current names are indicated parenthetically.)

Rivet (1924)
Paul Rivet (1924) lists a total of 46 independent language families in North and Central America. Olive and Janambre are extinct languages of Tamaulipas, Mexico.

North American families
Algonkin
Beothuk
Eskimo
Hoka
Iroquois (Irokwa)
Kaddo
Keres
Kiowa
Klamath
Kutenai
Muskhogi
Na-Dene
Penutia
Sahaptin
Salish
Siou (Syu)
Tano
Timukua
Chimakum
Tunika
Uto-Azten
Waiilatpu
Wakash
Yuki
Yuchi
Zuñi

Central American families
Amusgo
Kuikatec
Kuitlatek
Lenka
Maya
Miskito-Sumo-Matagalpa
Mixe-Zoke
Mixtek
Olive
Otomi
Paya
Subtiaba
Tarask (Michoacano)
Totonak
Chinantek
Waїkuri
Xanambre (Janambre)
Xikake (Jicaque)
Xinka (Jinca, Sinca)
Zapotek

Sapir (1929): Encyclopædia Britannica
Below is Edward Sapir's (1929) famous Encyclopædia Britannica classification. Note that Sapir's classification was controversial at the time and it additionally was an original proposal (unusual for general encyclopedias). Sapir was part of a "lumper" movement in Native American language classification. Sapir himself writes of his classification: "A more far-reaching scheme than Powell's [1891 classification], suggestive but not demonstrable in all its features at the present time" (Sapir 1929: 139). Sapir's classifies all the languages in North America into only 6 families: Eskimo–Aleut, Algonkin–Wakashan, Nadene, Penutian, Hokan–Siouan, and Aztec–Tanoan. Sapir's classification (or something derivative) is still commonly used in general languages-of-the-world type surveys. (Note that the question marks that appear in Sapir's list below are present in the original article.)

 "Proposed Classification of American Indian Languages North of Mexico (and Certain Languages of Mexico and Central America)"

Voegelin & Voegelin (1965): The "Consensus" of 1964

The Voegelin & Voegelin (1965) classification was the result of a conference of Americanist linguists held at Indiana University in 1964. This classification identifies 16 main genetic units.

Chumashan, Comecrudan, and Coahuiltecan are included in Hokan with "reservations". Esselen is included in Hokan with "strong reservations". Tsimshian and Zuni are included in Penutian with reservations.

Campbell & Mithun (1979): The "Black Book"
Campbell & Mithun's 1979 classification is more conservative, since it insists on more rigorous demonstration of genetic relationship before grouping. Thus, many of the speculative phyla of previous authors are "split".

Goddard (1996), Campbell (1997), Mithun (1999)
(preliminary)

Families
 Algic
 Algonquian
 Wiyot (> Ritwan?)
 Yurok (> Ritwan?)
 Na-Dene
 Eyak-Athabaskan
 Eyak
 Athabaskan
 Tlingit
 Caddoan (> Macro-Siouan?)
 Chimakuan
 Chinookan (> Penutian?)
 Chumashan [chúmash]
 Comecrudan
 Coosan [kus] (> Coast Penutian?)
 Eskimo–Aleut
 Eskimoan
 Aleut = Unangan
 Iroquoian
 Kalapuyan [kalapúyan]
 Kiowa–Tanoan
 Maiduan
 Muskogean
 Palaihnihan (Achumawi–Atsugewi)
 Pomoan
 Sahaptian
 Salishan
 Shastan
 Siouan–Catawban
 Siouan
 Catawban
 Tsimshianic
 Utian
 Miwok
 Costanoan
 Utaztecan
 Numic = Plateau
 Tübatulabal = Kern
 Takic = Southern California
 Hopi = Pueblo
 Tepiman = Pimic
 Taracahitic
 Tubar
 Corachol
 Aztecan
 Wakashan
 Kwakiutlan
 Nootkan
 Wintuan (> Coast Penutian?)
 Yokutsan
 Yuman–Cochimi
 Yuman
 Cochimi

Isolates
 Adai
 Alsea [alsi] (> Coast Penutian?)
 Atakapa (> Tunican?)
 Beothuk (unclassifiable?)
 Cayuse
 Chimariko
 Chitimacha (> Tunican?)
 Coahuilteco
 Cotoname = Carrizo de Camargo
 Esselen
 Haida
 Karankawa
 Karuk
 Keres
 Klamath-Modoc
 Kootenai
 Molala
 Natchez
 Salinan
 Siuslaw (> Coast Penutian?)
 Takelma
 Timucua
 Tonkawa
 Tunica (> Tunican?)
 Wappo (> Yuki–Wappo)
 Washo
 Yana
 Yuchi (> Siouan)
 Yuki (> Yuki–Wappo)
 Zuni

Stocks

 Yuki–Wappo, supported by Elmendorf (1981, 1997)

The unity of Penutian languages outside Mexico is considered probably by many linguists:
 Penutian
 Tsimshianic
 Chinookan
 Takelma
 Kalapuya (not close to Takelma: Tarpent & Kendall 1998)
 Maidun
 Oregon Coast-Wintu (Whistler 1977, Golla 1997)
 Alsea
 Coosan
 Siuslaw
 Wintuan
 Plateau
 Sahaptian
 Klamath
 Molala
 Cayuse ? (poor data)
 Yok-Utian ?
 Yana
 Yana

Siouan–Yuchi "probable"; Macro-Siouan likely:
 Macro-Siouan
 Iroquoian–Caddoan
 Iroquoian
 Caddoan
 Siouan–Yuchi
 Siouan–Catawban
 Yuchi

Natchez–Muskogean most likely of the Gulf hypothesis
 Natchez–Muskogean
 Natchez
 Muskogean

Hokan: most promising proposals
 Hokan
 Karok
 Chimariko
 Shastan
 Palaihnihan
 Yana
 Washo
 Pomoan
 Esselen
 Salinan
 Yuman–Cochimi
 Seri

"Unlikely" to be Hokan:
Chumashan
Tonkawa
Karankawa

Subtiaba–Tlapanec is likely part of Otomanguean (Rensch 1977, Oltrogge 1977).

Aztec–Tanoan is "undemonstrated"; Mosan is a Sprachbund.

Mesoamerica
(Consensus conservative classification)

Families
 Uto-Aztecan (Other branches outside Mesoamerica. See North America) languages
 Corachol (Cora–Huichol)
 Aztecan (Nahua–Pochutec)

 Totonac–Tepehua
 Otomanguean
 Otopamean
 Popolocan–Mazatecan
 Subtiaba–Tlapanec
 Amuzgo
 Mixtecan
 Chatino–Zapotec
 Chinantec
 Chiapanec–Mangue (extinct)

 Tequistlatec-Jicaque
 Mixe–Zoque
 Mayan
 Misumalpan (Outside Mesoamerica proper. See South America)
 Chibchan (Outside Mesoamerica proper. See South America)
 Paya

Isolates
 Purépecha
 Cuitlatec (extinct)
 Huave
 Xinca (extinct?)
 Lenca (extinct)

Proposed stocks
 Hokan (see North America)
 Tequistlatec-Jicaque
 Macro-Mayan (Penutian affiliation now considered doubtful.)
 Totonac–Tepehua
 Huave
 Mixe–Zoque
 Mayan
 Macro-Chibchan
 Chibchan
 Misumalpan
 Paya (sometimes placed in Chibchan proper)
 Xinca
 Lenca

South America

Notable early classifications of classifications of indigenous South American language families include those by Filippo Salvatore Gilii (1780–84), Lorenzo Hervás y Panduro (1784–87), Daniel Garrison Brinton (1891), Paul Rivet (1924), John Alden Mason (1950), and Čestmír Loukotka (1968). Other classifications include those of Jacinto Jijón y Caamaño (1940–45), Antonio Tovar (1961; 1984), and Jorge A. Suárez (1974).

Glottolog 4.1 (2019)
Glottolog 4.1 (2019) recognizes 44 independent families and 64 isolates in South America.

South American languages families proposed in Glottolog 4.1

Families (44)
Arawakan (78)
Tupian (71)
Pano-Tacanan (45)
Quechuan (45)
Cariban (42)
Mayan (33)
Nuclear-Macro-Je (30)
Chibchan (27)
Tucanoan (26)
Chapacuran (12)
Chocoan (9)
Huitotoan (7)
Matacoan (7)
Arawan (6)
Barbacoan (6)
Nambiquaran (6)
Zaparoan (6)
Guahiboan (5)
Guaicuruan (5)
Lengua-Mascoy (5)
Yanomamic (5)
Aymaran (4)
Chicham (4)
Chonan (4)
Jodi-Saliban (4)
Kamakanan (4)
Naduhup (4)
Bororoan (3)
Cahuapanan (3)
Charruan (3)
Kawesqar (3)
Peba-Yagua (3)
Zamucoan (3)
Araucanian (2)
Boran (2)
Harakmbut (2)
Hibito-Cholon (2)
Huarpean (2)
Kakua-Nukak (2)
Katukinan (2)
Otomaco-Taparita (2)
Puri-Coroado (2)
Ticuna-Yuri (2)
Uru-Chipaya (2)

Isolates (64)
Aewa
Aikanã
Andaqui
Andoque
Arutani
Atacame
Betoi-Jirara
Camsá
Candoshi-Shapra
Canichana
Cayubaba
Chiquitano
Chono
Cofán
Culli
Fulniô
Guachi
Guamo
Guató
Irántxe-Münkü
Itonama
Jirajaran
Kanoê
Kariri
Kunza
Kwaza
Leco
Lule
Máku
Matanawí
Mato Grosso Arára
Mochica
Mosetén-Chimané
Movima
Muniche
Mure
Omurano
Oti
Páez
Pankararú
Payagua
Pirahã
Puelche
Puinave
Pumé
Puquina
Ramanos
Sapé
Sechuran
Tallán
Taruma
Taushiro
Timote-Cuica
Tinigua
Trumai
Tuxá
Urarina
Vilela
Waorani
Warao
Xukurú
Yámana
Yuracaré
Yurumanguí

Rivet (1924)
Paul Rivet (1924) lists 77 independent language families of South America.

Mason (1950)
Classification of South American languages by J. Alden Mason (1950):

 Chibchan
 Western
 Talamanca
 Barbacoa
 Pasto
 Cayapa-Colorado
 Guatuso
 Cuna
 Pacific
 Isthmian (Guaymí)
 Colombian
 Inter-Andine
 Páez
 Coconuco
 Popayanense
 Eastern
 Cundinamarca
 Arhuaco
 Central America
 ? Andakí (Andaquí)
 ? Betoi group

Languages probably of Chibchan affinities
 Panzaleo
 Cara, Caranki
 Kijo (Quijo)
 Misumalpan
 Cofán (Kofane)

Languages of doubtful Chibchan relationships
 Coche (Mocoa)
 Esmeralda
 Tairona, Chimila
 Yurumanguí
 Timote
 Candoshi, Chirino, Murato
 Cholón
 Híbito
 Copallén
 Aconipa (Akonipa)

Language families of central South America
 Yunca-Puruhán
 Yunca
 Puruhá
 Cañari (Canyari)
 Atalán
 Sec (Sechura, Tallán)
 Kechumaran
 Quechua
 Aymara
 Chiquitoan
 Macro-Guaicuruan
 Mataco-Macá
 Mataco
 Macá (Enimagá, Cochaboth)
 Guaicurú (Waicurú)
 Lule-Vilelan
 Tonocoté, Matará, Guacará

 Arawakan
 Chané, Chaná

Languages of probable Arawakan affinities
 Arauá group
 Apolista (Lapachu)
 Amuesha
 Tucuna (Tikuna)
 Tarumá
 Tacana

Languages of possible Arawakan relationships
 Tuyuneri
 Jirajara
 Jívaro
 Uru-Chipaya-Pukina
 Ochosuma
 Chango, Coast Uru

Cariban

Languages of probable Cariban affiliations
 Chocó, Cariban of Colombia
 Peba-Yagua
 Arda
 Yuma
 Palmella
 Yuri (Juri)
 Pimenteira

Macro-Tupí-Guaranian
 Tupí-Guaranian
 Yurimagua (Zurimagua)
 Arikem
 Miranyan (Boran)
 Witotoan
 Nonuya
 Muenane
 Fitita
 Orejón
 Coeruna
 Andoke
 Resigero
 Záparoan
 Omurano (Roamaina?)
 Sabela
 Canelo
 Awishira

Northern tropical lowland independent families
 Warrauan
 Auakéan
 Calianan
 Macuan
 Shirianán
 Sálivan, Macu, Piaróa
 Pamigua, Tinigua
 Otomacan, Guamo (Guama), Yaruran
 Guahiban
 Puinavean (Macú)
 Tucanoan (Betoyan)
 Coto
 Cahuapanan
 Muniche
 Panoan
 Chama languages
 Cashibo
 Mayoruna
 Itucale, Simacu, Urarina
 Aguano
 Chamicuro

Southern tropical lowland independent families
 Unclassified languages of Eastern Perú: Alon, Amasifuin, Carapacho, Cascoasoa, Chedua, Cholto, Chunanawa, Chusco, Cognomona, Chupacho, Huayana, Kikidcana (Quiquidcana), Moyo-pampa, Nindaso, Nomona, Pantahua, Payanso, Tepqui, Tingan, Tulumayo, Zapazo
 Small "families" of Bolivia: Itonama, Canichana, Cayuvava, Movima, Moseten, Leco, Yuracare
 Small languages of the Brazil-Bolivia border: Huari, Masáca, Capishaná, Puruborá, Mashubi, Kepikiriwat, Sanamaicá, Tuparí, Guaycarú, Aricapu, Yaputi, Aruashí, Canoa
 Catukinan
 Chapacuran: Wanyam (Huañam), Cabishí (Kabichi)
 Mascoian
 Zamucoan
 Guatoan
 Bororoan, Otuke
 Coraveca, Covareca
 Curucaneca, Curuminaca
 Nambicuaran
 Cabishí
 Muran
 Matanawí
 Trumaian
 Caraján
 Caririan

Macro-Ge
 Ge
 Caingang
 Camacán, Mashacalí, Purí (Coroado)
 Camacán
 Mashacalí
 Purí (Coroado)
 Patashó
 Malalí
 Coropó
 Botocudo

Other language families of eastern Brazil
 Shavanté (Chavanté, Šavante)
 Otí
 Opayé
 Cucurá
 Guaitacán
 Small languages of the Pernambuco region: Fulnió, Natú, Pancãrurú, Shocó, Shucurú, Tushá, Carapató, Payacú, Teremembé, Tarairiu (Ochucayana)

Southernmost languages
 Ataguitan
 Atacama
 Omawaca (Omahuaca)
 Diaguita (Calchaquí)
 Charrua, Kerandí, Chaná, etc.
 Allentiac (Huarpean)
 Sanavirón, Comechingónan
 Sanavirón
 Comechingón
 Araucanian
 Chono
 Puelchean
 Het (Chechehet)
 Chonan (Tewelche, Tehuelche), Ona
 Yahganan
 Alacalufan

Loukotka (1968)

Čestmír Loukotka (1968) proposed a total of 117 indigenous language families (called stocks by Loukotka) and isolates of South America.

Languages of Paleo-American tribes
A. Southern Division
1. Yámana
2. Alacaluf
3. Aksanás
4. Patagon
5. Gennaken
6. Chechehet
7. Sanaviron
B. Chaco Division
8. Guaicuru
9. Vilela
10. Mataco
11. Lengua
12. Zamuco
13. Chiquito
14. Gorgotoqui
Unclassified or unknown languages of the areas of Divisions A and B.
C. Division of Central Brazil
15. Charrua
16. Kaingán
17. Opaie
18. Puri
19. Mashakali
20. Botocudo
21. Baenan
22. Kamakan
23. Fulnio
24. Ge
25. Kukura (spurious)
26. Otí
27. Boróro
28. Karajá
Unclassified or unknown languages of the area of Division C.
D. Northeastern Division
29. Katembri
30. Tushá
31. Pankarurú
32. Chocó
33. Umán
34. Natú
35. Shukurú
36. Kiriri
37. Tarairiú
38. Gamela
Unclassified or unknown languages of the area of Division D.
E. Northwestern Division
39. Múra
40. Matanawí
41. Erikbaktsa
42. Nambikwára
43. Iranshe
44. Yabutí

Languages of tropical forest tribes
A. North Central Division
45. Tupi
46. Arawak
47. Otomac
48. Guamo
49. Taruma
50. Piaroa
51. Tinigua
52. Máku
53. Tucuna
54. Yagua
55. Kahuapana
56. Munichi
57. Cholona
58. Mayna
59. Murato
60. Auishiri
61. Itucale
62. Jíbaro
63. Sabela
64. Záparo
65. Chapacura
66. Huari
67. Capixana
68. Koaiá
69. Purubora
70. Trumai
71. Cayuvava
72. Mobima
73. Itonama
74. Canichana
Unclassified or unknown languages of the area of the North Central Division.
B. South Central Division
75. Pano
76. Tacana
77. Toyeri
78. Yuracare
79. Mosetene
80. Guató
Unclassified or unknown languages of the area of the South Central Division.
C. Languages of the Central Division
81. Tucano
82. Andoque
83. Uitoto
84. Bora
85. Yuri
86. Makú
87. Catuquina
88. Arawa
Unclassified or unknown languages of the area of the Central Division.
D. Northeastern Division
89. Karaib
90. Yanoama
91. Uarao
92. Auaké
93. Kaliána
Unclassified or unknown languages of the area of the North Eastern Division.

Languages of Andean tribes
A. Northern Division
94. Chibcha
95. Timote
96. Jirajara
97. Chocó
98. Idabaez
Unclassified or unknown division.
B. North Central Division
99. Yurimangui
100. Cofán
101. Sechura
102. Catacao
103. Culli
104. Tabancale
105. Copallén
106. Chimú
C. South Central Division
107. Quechua
108. Aymara
109. Puquina
110. Uro
111. Atacama
112. Leco
Unclassified or unknown languages of the area of the Ancient Inca Empire.
D. Southern Division
113. Mapuche
114. Diaguit
115. Humahuaca
116. Lule
117. Huarpe

Kaufman (1990)

Families and isolates

Terrence Kaufman's classification is meant to be a rather conservative genetic grouping of the languages of South America (and a few in Central America). He has 118 genetic units. Kaufman believes for these 118 units "that there is little likelihood that any of the groups recognized here will be broken apart". Kaufman uses more specific terminology than only language family, such as language area, emergent area, and language complex, where he recognizes issues such as partial mutual intelligibility and dialect continuums. The list below collapses these into simply families. Kaufman's list is numbered and grouped by "geolinguistic region". The list below is presented in alphabetic order. Kaufman uses an anglicized orthography for his genetic units, which is mostly used only by himself. His spellings have been retained below.

Stocks
In addition to his conservative list, Kaufman list several larger "stocks" which he evaluates. The names of the stocks are often obvious hyphenations of two members; for instance, the Páes-Barbakóa stock consists of the Páesan and Barbakóan families. If the composition is not obvious, it is indicated parenthetically. Kaufman puts question marks by Kechumara and Mosetén-Chon stocks.

"Good" stocks:
 Awaké–Kaliana (Arutani–Sape)
 Chibcha–Misumalpa
 Ezmeralda–Jaruro
 Jurí–Tikuna
 Kechumara  (=Kechua + Haki) (good?)
 Lule–Vilela
 Mosetén–Chon (good?)
 Páes–Barbakóa
 Pano–Takana
 Sechura–Katakao
 Wamo–Chapakúra

"Probable" stocks:
 Macro-Je (=Chikitano + Boróroan + Aimoré + Rikbaktsá + Je + Jeikó + Kamakánan + Mashakalían + Purían + Fulnío + Karajá + Ofayé + Guató)
 Mura–Matanawí

"Promising" stocks:
 Kaliánan (=Awaké + Kaliana + Maku)

"Maybe" stocks:
 Bora–Witoto
 Hívaro–Kawapana
 Kunsa–Kapishaná (now abandoned)
 Pukina–Kolyawaya
 Sáparo–Yawa

Clusters and networks

Kaufman's largest groupings are what he terms clusters and networks. Clusters are equivalent to macro-families (or phyla or superfamilies). Networks are composed of clusters. Kaufman views all of these larger groupings to be hypothetical and his list is to be used as a means to identify which hypotheses most need testing.

Campbell (2012)

Lyle Campbell (2012) proposed the following list of 53 uncontroversial indigenous language families and 55 isolates of South America – a total of 108 independent families and isolates. Language families with 9 or more languages are highlighted in bold. The remaining language families all have 6 languages or fewer.

Families
Arawakan (Maipurean, Maipuran) (~65) – widespread
Cariban (~40) – Brazil, Venezuela, Colombia, etc.
Chapacuran (Txapakúran) (9) – Brazil, Bolivia
Chibchan (23) – Colombia, Venezuela, Panama, Costa Rica
Jêan (12) – Brazil
Pano–Takanan (~30) – Brazil, Peru, Bolivia
Makúan (Makú–Puinavean, Puinavean, Guaviaré–Japurá) (8) – Brazil, Colombia, Venezuela
Quechuan (23 ?) – Colombia, Ecuador, Peru, Bolivia, Argentina
Tukanoan (Tucanoan) (~20) – Colombia, Ecuador, Peru, Brazil
Tupían (~55) – Brazil, Paraguay, Bolivia, etc.
Arawan (Arahuan, Arauan, Arawán) (6) – Brazil, Peru
Aymaran (2) – Bolivia, Peru
Barbacoan (5) – Colombia, Ecuador
Bororoan (3) – Brazil
Cahuapanan (2) – Peru
Cañar–Puruhá (2; uncertain) – Ecuador
Charruan (3) – Uruguay, Argentina
Chipaya–Uru (3) – Bolivia
Chocoan (2–6) – Colombia, Panama
Cholonan (2) – Peru
Chonan (Chon) (3) – Argentina
Guaicuruan (Waykuruan) (5) – Argentina, Paraguay, Brazil
Guajiboan (4) – Colombia
Harákmbut–Katukinan (3; uncertain) – Peru, Brazil
Huarpean (Warpean) (2) – Argentina
Jabutían (2) – Brazil
Jirajaran (3) – Venezuela
Jivaroan (4 ?) – Peru, Ecuador
Kamakanan (5 ?) – Brazil
Karajá (2 ?) – Brazil
Karirian (Karirí) (4) – Brazil
Krenákan (Botocudoan, Aimoré) (3) – Brazil
Lule–Vilelan (2) – Argentina
Mascoyan (4) – Paraguay
Matacoan (4) – Argentina, Paraguay, Bolivia
Maxakalían (3) – Brazil
Mosetenan (2) – Bolivia
Muran (4, only 1 living) – Brazil
Nambikwaran (5 ?) – Brazil
Qawasqaran (Kaweskaran, Alacalufan) (2–3) – Chile
Otomacoan (2) – Venezuela
Paezan (1–3; isolate ?) – Colombia
Purían (2) – Brazil
Sáliban (Sálivan) (3 ?) – Venezuela, Colombia
Sechura–Catacaoan (3) – Peru
Timotean (2) – Venezuela
Tikuna–Yuri – Peru, Colombia, Brazil
Tiniguan (2) – Colombia
Yaguan (3) – Peru
Witotoan (Huitotoan) (5) – Colombia, Peru
Yanomaman (4) – Venezuela, Brazil
Zamucoan (2) – Paraguay, Bolivia
Zaparoan (3) – Peru, Ecuador

Isolates
Aikaná – Brazil
Andaquí – Colombia
Andoque (Andoke) – Colombia, Peru
Atacameño (Cunza, Kunza, Atacama, Lipe) – Chile, Bolivia, Argentina
Awaké (Ahuaqué, Uruak) – Venezuela, Brazil
Baenan – Brazil
Betoi – Colombia (small family ?)
Camsá (Sibundoy, Coche) – Colombia
Candoshi (Candoxi, Maina, Shapra, Murato) – Peru
Canichana – Bolivia
Cayuvava (Cayuwaba, Cayubaba) – Bolivia
Chiquitano – Bolivia
Chono – Chile
Cofán (A’ingaé) – Colombia, Ecuador
Culle – Peru
Gamela – Brazil
Guachí – Brazil
Guató – Brazil
Irantxe (Iranche, Münkü) – Brazil
Itonama (Saramo, Machoto) – Bolivia, Brazil
Jeikó (Jeicó, Jaiko) – Brazil (Macro–Jêan ?)
Jotí (Yuwana) – Venezuela
Kaliana (Sapé, Caliana, Cariana, Chirichano) – Venezuela
Kapixaná (Kanoé) – Brazil
Koayá (Kwaza, Koaiá, Arara) – Brazil
Máku (Mako) – Brazil
Mapudungu (Mapudungun, Araucano, Mapuche, Maputongo) – Chile, Argentina
Matanauí – Brazil
Mochica (Yunga, Yunca, Chimú, Mochica, Muchic) – Peru
Movima – Bolivia
Munichi (Muniche, Munichino, Otanabe) – Peru
Natú (Peagaxinan) – Brazil
Ofayé (Opayé, Ofayé–Xavante) – Brazil (Macro–Jêan ?)
Omurano (Humurana, Numurana) – Peru
Otí – Brazil
Pankararú (Pancararu, Pancarurú, Brancararu) – Brazil
Payaguá – Paraguay
Puquina – Bolivia
Rikbaktsá (Aripaktsá, Eribatsa, Eripatsa, Canoeiro) – Brazil (Macro–Jêan ?)
Sabela (Huao, Auca, Huaorani, Auishiri) – Ecuador
Taruma (Taruamá) – Brazil, Guyana
Taushiro (Pinchi, Pinche) – Peru
Tequiraca (Tekiraka, Aushiri, Auishiri, Avishiri) – Peru
Trumai (Trumaí) – Brazil
Tuxá – Brazil
Urarina (Simacu, Kachá, Itucale) – Peru
Wamoé (Huamoé, Huamoi, Uamé, Umã; Araticum, Atikum) – Brazil
Warao (Guarao, Warau, Guaruno) – Guyana, Suriname, Venezuela
Xokó – Brazil
Xukurú – Brazil
Yagan (Yaghan, Yamana, Yámana) – Chile
Yaruro (Pumé, Llaruro, Yaruru, Yuapín) – Venezuela
Yaté (Furniô, Fornió, Carnijó; Iatê) – Brazil
Yuracaré – Bolivia
Yurumangui – Colombia

Campbell (2012) leaves out the classifications of these languages as uncertain.

Boran – Brazil, Colombia
Esmeralda – Ecuador
Guamo – Venezuela
Leko – Bolivia
Mure – Bolivia
Puinave – Colombia, Venezuela

Jolkesky (2016)

Jolkesky (2016) lists 43 language families and 66 language isolates (and/or unclassified languages) in South America – a total of 109 independent families and isolates.

† = extinct

Families
Andoke-Urekena
Arawa
Barbakoa
Bora-Muinane
Chacha-Cholon-Hibito
Chapakura-Wañam
Charrua
Chibcha
Choko
Chon
Duho
Guahibo
Harakmbet-Katukina
Jaqi
Jirajara †
Jivaro
Karib
Kawapana
Kechua
Lengua-Maskoy
Macro-Arawak
Macro-Mataguayo-Guaykuru
Macro-Jê
Mapudungun
Moseten-Tsimane
Mura-Matanawi
Nambikwara
Otomako-Taparita †
Pano-Takana
Peba-Yagua
Puinave-Nadahup
Puri †
Tallan †
Timote-Kuika
Tinigua-Pamigua
Tukano
Tupi
Uru-Chipaya
Warpe †
Witoto-Okaina
Yanomami
Zamuko
Zaparo

Isolates and unclassified languages
Aikanã
Andaki †
Arara do Rio Branco
Arutani
Atakame †
Atikum †
Aushiri †
Chono †
Guamo †
Guato
Gününa Këna
Iranche/Myky
Itonama
Kakan †
Kamsa
Kañari †
Kanichana
Kanoe
Kawesqar
Kayuvava
Kerandi †
Kimbaya †
Kingnam †
Kofan
Komechingon †
Koraveka †
Kueva †
Kulle †
Kunza †
Kuruminaka †
Kwaza
Leko
Lule †
Maku
Malibu †
Mochika †
Mokana †
Morike †
Movima
Muzo-Kolima †
Omurano
Oti †
Paez
Panche †
Pijao †
Puruha †
Sanaviron †
Sape
Sechura †
Tarairiu †
Taruma
Taushiro
Tekiraka
Trumai
Tuxa †
Umbra
Urarina
Vilela
Waorani
Warao
Xukuru †
Yagan
Yaruro
Yurakare
Yurumangui †
Zenu †

Creoles, pidgins, and secret languages
Kallawaya
Maskoy Pidgin
Media Lengua
Ndyuka-Tiriyo

All of the Americas

Swadesh (1960 or earlier)
Morris Swadesh further consolidated Sapir's North American classification and expanded it to group all indigenous languages of the Americas in just 6 families, 5 of which were entirely based in the Americas.

 Vasco-Dene languages included the Eskimo–Aleut, Na-Dene, Wakashan and Kutenai families along with most of the languages of Eurasia.
 Macro-Hokan roughly comprised a combination of Sapir's Hokan–Siouan and Almosan families and expanded into Central America including the Jicaque language.
 Macro-Mayan comprising Mayan along with Sapir's Penutian and Aztec-Tanoan families, the Otomanguean languages and various languages of Central and South America including the Chibchan languages, the Paezan languages and the Tucanoan languages.
 Macro-Quechua comprising the Zuni language, the Purépecha language and various languages of South America including Quechua, the Aymara language, the Panoan languages and most of the various other languages of Patagonia and the Andes.
 Macro-Carib, an almost entirely South American family including the Carib languages, the Macro-Je languages and the Jirajara languages, albeit including some Caribbean languages.
 Macro-Arawak, a family primarily confined to South America and its component families included the Arawakan languages and the Tupian languages. However, it also was proposed to include the Taíno language in the Caribbean and the Timucua language in Florida.

Greenberg (1960, 1987)
Joseph Greenberg's classification in his 1987 book Language in the Americas is best known for the highly controversial assertion that all North, Central and South American language families other than Eskimo–Aleut and Na-Dene including Haida, are part of an Amerind macrofamily.  This assertion of only three major American language macrofamiles is supported by DNA evidence, although the DNA evidence does not provide support for the details of his classification.

 Northern Amerind
 Almosan–Keresiouan
 Almosan
 Algic
 Kutenai
 Mosan
 Wakashan
 Salish
 Chimakuan
 Caddoan
 Keres
 Siouan
 Iroquoian
 Penutian
 California Penutian
 Maidu
 Miwok–Costanoan
 Wintun
 Yokuts
 Chinook
 Mexican Penutian (=Macro-Mayan)
 Huave
 Mayan
 Mixe–Zoque
 Totonac
 Oregon Penutian
 Plateau Penutian
 Tsimshian
 Yukian
 Gulf
 Atakapa
 Chitimacha
 Muskogean
 Natchez
 Tunica
 Zuni
 Hokan
 Nuclear Hokan
 Northern
 Karok–Shasta
 Yana
 Pomo
 Washo
 Esselen–Yuman
 Salinan–Seri
 Waicuri
 Maratino
 Quinigua
 Tequistlatec
 Coahuiltecan
 Tonkawa
 Nuclear Coahuiltecan
 Karankawa
 Subtiaba
 Jicaque
 Yurumangui
 Central Amerind
 Kiowa–Tanoan
 Otomanguean
 Uto-Aztecan
 Chibchan–Paezan
 Chibchan
 Nuclear Chibchan
 Antioquia
 Aruak
 Chibcha
 Cuna
 Guaymi
 Malibu
 Misumalpan
 Motilon
 Rama
 Talamanca
 Paya
 Purépecha
 Xinca
 Yanomam
 Yunca–Puruhan
 Paezan
 Allentiac
 Atacama
 Betoi
 Chimu
 Itonama
 Jirajara
 Mura
 Nuclear Paezan
 Andaqui
 Barbacoa
 Choco
 Paez
 Timucua
 Warrao
 Andean (Greenberg (1960) joined Andean and Equatorial, but Greenberg (1987) did not)
 Aymara
 Itucale–Sabela
 Itucale
 Mayna
 Sabela
 Cahuapana–Zaparo
 Cahuapano
 Zaparo
 Northern
 Catacao
 Cholona
 Culli
 Leco
 Sechura
 Quechua
 Southern
 Qawesqar
 Mapundungu
 Gennaken
 Patagon
 Yamana
 Equatorial–Tucanoan
 Equatorial
 Macro-Arawakan
 Arawakan
 Guahibo
 Katembri
 Otomaco
 Tinigua
 Cayuvava
 Coche
 Jivaro–Kandoshi
 Cofan
 Esmeralda
 Jivaro
 Kandoshi
 Yaruro
 Kariri–Tupi
 Kariri
 Tupian
 Piaroa
 Taruma
 Timote
 Trumai
 Tusha
 Yuracare
 Zamucoan
 Tucanoan
 Auixiri
 Canichana
 Capixana
 Catuquina
 Gamella
 Huari
 Iranshe
 Kaliana–Maku
 Auake
 Kaliana
 Maku
 Koaia
 Movima
 Muniche
 Nambikwara
 Natu
 Pankaruru
 Puinave
 Shukura
 Ticuna–Yuri
 Ticuna
 Yuri
 Tucanoan
 Uman
 Ge–Pano–Carib
 Macro-Ge
 Bororo
 Botocudo
 Caraja
 Chiquito
 Erikbatsa
 Fulnio
 Ge–Kaingang
 Ge
 Kaingang
 Guato
 Kamakan
 Mashakali
 Opaie
 Oti
 Puri
 Yabuti
 Macro-Panoan
 Charruan
 Lengua
 Lule–Vilela
 Lule
 Vilela
 Mataco–Guaicuru
 Guaicuru
 Mataco
 Moseten
 Pano–Tacanan
 Panoan
 Tacanan
 Macro-Carib
 Andoke
 Bora–Uitoto
 Boro
 Uitoto
 Carib
 Kukura
 Yagua

Mixed languages
In American Indian Languages: The Historical Linguistics of Native America, Lyle Campbell describes various pidgins and trade languages spoken by the indigenous peoples of the Americas. Some of these mixed languages have not been documented and are known only by name.

 Medny Aleut (Copper Island Aleut)
 Chinook Jargon
 Broken Slavey (Slavey Jargon)
 Loucheux Jargon
 Michif (French Cree, Métis, Metchif)
 Broken Oghibbeway (Broken Ojibwa)
 Basque-Algonquian Pidgin (spoken by the Basques, Micmacs, and Montagnais in eastern Canada)
 Delaware Jargon
 Pidgin Massachusett
 Jargonized Powhatan
 Lingua Franca Creek
 Lingua Franca Apalachee
 Mobilian Jargon
 Güegüence-Nicarao (formerly spoken in Nicaragua)
 Carib Pidgin or Ndjuka-Amerindian Pidgin (Ndjuka-Trio)
 Carib Pidgin-Arawak mixed language
 Media Lengua
 Catalangu
 Callahuaya (Machaj-Juyai, Kallawaya)
 Nheengatú or Lingua Geral Amazonica ("Lingua Boa," Lingua Brasílica, Lingua Geral do Norte)
 Lingua Geral do Sul or Lingua Geral Paulista (Tupí Austral)
 Labrador Eskimo Pidgin
 Hudson Strait Pidgin Eskimo (spoken from 1750–1850)
 Nootka Jargon (18th–19th centuries; later replaced by Chinook Jargon)
 Trader Navajo
 Yopará (Guaraní-Spanish pidgin)
 Afro-Seminole Creole (variety of Gullah)
 Haida Jargon
 Kutenai Jargon
 Guajiro-Spanish mixed language

Lingua francas
 Ocaneechi (spoken in Virginia and the Carolinas in early colonial times)
 Tuscarora language
 Plains sign language

Linguistic areas

See also

Indigenous languages of South America
List of indigenous languages of South America
List of extinct languages of South America
Extinct languages of the Marañón River basin
List of extinct Uto-Aztecan languages
List of unclassified languages of South America
:Category:Unclassified languages of South America
Classification of indigenous peoples of the Americas
Classification of Southeast Asian languages
Intercontinental Dictionary Series

Notes and references

Bibliography
 See: Indigenous languages of the Americas#Bibliography

External links
Native American Language Net

Diachronic Atlas of Comparative Linguistics (DiACL)
Languages of hunter-gatherers and their neighbors, The University of Texas at Austin
The Intercontinental Dictionary Series

Indigenous languages of the Americas
Americas